Liam Brown (born 6 April 1999) is a Scottish professional footballer who plays for Queen's Park as a midfielder. He has previously played for Motherwell, Edinburgh City and at Stenhousemuir on-loan until January 2023.

Club career
Brown started his career at Queen's Park, making his debut at 17 in a 3–0 defeat at home to East Stirlingshire on 13 February 2016.

Brown signed for Motherwell in June 2017, initially to play in the under-20 side. He made his first team debut on 12 May 2018, as a substitute in a 3–0 win against Hamilton Academical.

He was released by Motherwell in 2019 and then spent two years with Edinburgh City. Brown returned to Queen's Park in June 2021, signing a three-year contract. Queen's Park paid a transfer fee to acquire Brown, which was the first time the formerly amateur club had done this in its 154-year history. He was loaned to Stenhousemuir early in the 2022–23 season.

Career statistics

References

1999 births
Living people
Scottish footballers
Association football midfielders
Queen's Park F.C. players
Motherwell F.C. players
Scottish Professional Football League players
Footballers from Glasgow
F.C. Edinburgh players